Park Jung-kwon (born July 21, 1981) is a South Korean professional baseball infielder currently playing for the SK Wyverns of the KBO League.

References

External links
Career statistics and player information from the KBO League

Park Jung-kwon at SK Wyverns Baseball Club 

SSG Landers players
KBO League infielders
South Korean baseball players
Korean Series MVPs
Dongguk University alumni
People from Jeonju
1981 births
Living people
Sportspeople from North Jeolla Province